Aleksei was a Russian archpriest who became known for converting to Judaism. He was born probably in Novgorod around 1425 and died in Moscow in 1488.

In the last quarter of the fifteenth century, when a schism arose in the Russian Orthodox Church and many new sects sprang up, Aleksei became a convert to Judaism. Some of the new sects had shown a decided tendency to revert to the old Mosaic law. This probably suggested to the influential Jew Skhariyah (Zechariah), of Kiev, the idea of spreading Judaism among the Russians of Pskov and Novgorod. Skhariyah belonged to the suite of the Gediminid Prince Michael Olelkovich, who came to Novgorod in 1471. The first convert in Novgorod was the priest Dionisy, who introduced to Skhariyah his colleague, the archpriest (protopop) Aleksei. The latter was the most zealous of the new converts, and did successful missionary work among all classes, especially among the clergy. The new community appreciated his labors so highly that the name of Abraham was conferred upon him, while his wife's name was changed to Sarah.

When the grand duke of Muscovy, Ivan III, visited Novgorod in 1480, Aleksei found favor in his eyes. The grand duke took Aleksei with him to Moscow and put him at the head of the Cathedral of the Dormition, while his friend Dionisy was at the same time appointed priest of the Archangel Cathedral in the same city. Aleksei enjoyed the confidence of the grand duke in a high degree and had free access to him. The court party of Sophia Paleologue alleged that he succeeded in converting his secretary, Fyodor Kuritsyn, the archimandrite Zosima, the monk Zechariah, Elena of Moldavia (wife of Ivan the Young), and many other prominent personages. The grand duke at first, probably for political reasons, protected the heretics, but later on was constrained to persecute them. This campaign resulted in Helena's son Dmitry being disinherited in favour of Sophia's son Vasily.

References

Resources
Rosenthal, Herman,  "Aleksei". Jewish Encyclopedia. Funk and Wagnalls, 1901–1906, citing:
Platon, Kratkaya Tserkovnaya Rossiskaya Istoriya, Moscow, 1833;
N. Rudnev, Rassuzhdenie o Yeresyakh i Raskolakh Byvshikh v Russkoi Tserkvi so Vremeni Vladimira  Velikago do Ioanna Groznago (Treatise on the Sects and Schism in the Russian Church, from the time of Vladimir the Great to Ivan the Terrible), Moscow, 1838;
Karamzin, Istoriya Rossii, vi. 154;
Panov, Zhurnal Ministerstva Narodnago Prosvyeshcheniya, No. 159, p. 261.

15th-century converts to Judaism
Russian Jews
Russian Eastern Orthodox priests
Converts to Judaism from Eastern Orthodoxy
Former Russian Orthodox Christians
1425 births
1488 deaths
15th-century Eastern Orthodox priests